The name Nanette has been used for three tropical cyclones in the Eastern Pacific Ocean.
 Tropical Storm Nanette (1967)
 Hurricane Nanette (1971)
 Tropical Storm Nanette (1975)

The name Nanette has also been used for one tropical cyclone in the Western Pacific Ocean.
 Typhoon Nanette (1947) (T4713)

Pacific hurricane set index articles
Pacific typhoon set index articles